Patricia A. Crawford (September 6, 1928 – February 11, 2008) is a former Republican member of the Pennsylvania House of Representatives. She ran for Pennsylvania Treasurer in 1976 but lost to Democratic nominee Robert E. Casey.

References

Republican Party members of the Pennsylvania House of Representatives
Women state legislators in Pennsylvania
1928 births
2008 deaths
20th-century American politicians
20th-century American women politicians
People from Middletown, Pennsylvania
21st-century American women